Ordinary is the tenth studio album by Japanese music duo Every Little Thing. It was released on September 21, 2011, by Avex Trax.

Background 
To celebrate the 15th anniversary of the band in the music industry, the album was released in three formats: CD, DVD+DVD and a special CD+DVD edition.

The album includes the single "Sora/Koe", which was used as theme songs for the 2011 Pokémon movie: Black—Victini and Reshiram/White—Victini and Zekrom. The last single from the album, entitled "Ai ga Aru", was used as theme song for TV drama Full Throttle Girl (Zenkai Girl). Also, for promotional purposes the songs "Tomorrow", "Ordinary" and "Begin" were used in adverts for H.I.S., Kracie and The Japan Jewellery Association, respectively.

Track listing

Notes
 co-arranged by Every Little Thing
 co-arranged by Ichiro Ito

Charts

References 

2011 albums
Every Little Thing (band) albums